Greg Stolt was a basketball player who most recently played for Cholet in France - Betclic Elite. He played college basketball for Billy Donovan's Florida Gators men's basketball team and has been honored as an SEC Basketball Legend. He was also associate vice president for the NBA's basketball operations in China.

References

1976 births
Florida Gators men's basketball players
Power forwards (basketball)
Sportspeople from Huntsville, Alabama
Living people